Nerula is a genus of dicot skippers in the butterfly family Hesperiidae (Eudaminae).

Species
There are two species recognised in the genus Nerula:
Nerula fibrena (Hewitson, 1877) - Venezuela, Brazil (Amazonas), Colombia. 
Nerula tuba  Evans, 1953 - Brazil (Pará)

References

Natural History Museum Lepidoptera genus database

Hesperiidae
Hesperiidae genera
Taxa named by Paul Mabille